The Third Haseloff cabinet is the current state government of Saxony-Anhalt, sworn in on 16 September 2021 after Reiner Haseloff was elected as Minister-President of Saxony-Anhalt by the members of the Landtag of Saxony-Anhalt. It is the 10th Cabinet of Saxony-Anhalt.

It was formed after the 2021 Saxony-Anhalt state election by the Christian Democratic Union (CDU), Social Democratic Party (SPD), and Free Democratic Party (FDP). Excluding the Minister-President, the cabinet comprises nine ministers. Six are members of the CDU, two are members of the SPD, and one is a member of the FDP.

Formation 

The previous cabinet was a coalition government of the CDU, SPD, and Greens led by Minister-President Reiner Haseloff.

The election took place on 6 June 2021, and resulted in a substantial swing toward to CDU, while the SPD recorded small losses and the Greens slight gains. The opposition AfD and The Left also suffered losses, while the FDP re-entered the Landtag with 6%.

Overall, the incumbent coalition increased its majority; the CDU and SPD alone held a one-seat majority. The CDU announced that they would seek exploratory talks with the SPD, Greens, and FDP. The Greens ruled out renewing the outgoing government on the basis that their involvement was no longer mathematically necessary. The FDP initially rejected a coalition with the CDU and SPD on the same grounds, but recanted their position two days after the election and stated they were open to talks.

Exploratory discussions began on 21 June with a meeting between the CDU and SPD. By 2 July, the CDU and FDP had come to an agreement on a number of points, and stated that they were seeking a third partner for a coalition. The CDU also noted that they had found difficulties during talks with the Greens, and wished for another meeting with the SPD.

On 7 July, the CDU, SPD, and FDP announced their intention to begin coalition negotiations together. After some debate, on 16 July the SPD party congress gave their approval for the party to commence negotiations. They began on 19 July and concluded with a 15-hour meeting on 6 August, at which the parties finalised their coalition contract and agreed to present it on the 9th.

The CDU and SPD both held membership ballots to approve the pact. The SPD announced their results on 4 September, with 63.4% of members approving the coalition on 60.4% turnout. The CDU announced on 10 September that their membership had voted 92.1% in favour; the FDP party congress also passed the contract later that evening with 98% approval from delegates. It was formally signed on 13 September.

Reiner Haseloff was elected Minister-President by the Landtag on 16 September after two rounds of voting. He unexpectedly lost the first ballot, receiving 48 votes in favour to 49 against, with no abstentions. On the second ballot, he was elected with 53 votes in favour to 43 against and one abstention.

Composition

External links

References 

Politics of Saxony-Anhalt
State governments of Germany
Cabinets established in 2021
2021 establishments in Germany